Breaktime is a 501(c)(3) non-profit based in Boston, Massachusetts which works to reduce young adult homelessness through transitional employment.

Breaktime employs young adults experiencing homelessness in living wage job opportunities. During 2020, the company employed 25 young adults experiencing homelessness, who worked to address food insecurity in the community, preparing and delivering over 650,000 meals to people experiencing food insecurity throughout Greater Boston.

Cofounders Connor Schoen and Tony Shu were honored in the 2021 Forbes 30 Under 30 listing for Breaktime's social impact in reducing young adult homelessness.

History
Cofounders Schoen and Shu met as Harvard undergraduate students while working at the homeless shelter, Y2Y, in Harvard Square. 

Schoen and Shu founded Breaktime in 2018. Breaktime became Boston’s first transitional employment program specifically tailored to young adults experiencing homelessness. The organization is led by a team of young adults.

Programs

Double Impact Initiative
In collaboration with the Community Works Service in Boston, Breaktime launched the Double Impact Initiative in response to the global pandemic. This program employs young adults experiencing homelessness to make and distribute meals for Bostonians experiencing food insecurity. The young adult associates work at local job sites like food pantries while also receiving above-minimum wages with matched savings and career counseling.

Participants (associates) in Breaktime's program attend a 3 week training program to explore their skills and potential career paths. After completing training, associates work at a three-month job placement site with a small business or nonprofit. Upon graduation, associates continue to receive nine months of regular check-ins and financial counseling and support from Breaktime.

According to Breaktime, 83% of program alumni are working and are in school compared to 12% prior to Breaktime. Breaktime alumni experience a 33% increase in wages and 77% of our alumni are now in stable housing.

Fundraising and partnerships
Breaktime is a part of the City of Boston's long term plan, "Rising to the Challenge," to end young adult homelessness in Boston and is one of the 54 recipients of the City of Boston's 2022 Youth Development Fund which provides $1.25 million in funding for youth and young adult violence prevention.

Breaktime is backed by supporters including the City of Boston, Liberty Mutual, Black Rock, Boston Resiliency Fund, The American Heart Association, Forest Foundation, William and Anngenette Tyler Fidelity Fund, MassMutual Foundation, John Hancock, Riley Foundation and Martin Richard Foundation

Breaktime is also partnered with  organizations including the Cape Verdean Association of Boston, Jewish Family & Children's Services, Project Hope, and Sojourner House.

References

External links 
 

Charities based in Massachusetts
Non-profit organizations based in Boston
Non-profit organizations based in Massachusetts
Charities for young adults
Homelessness charities